β-seco-amyrin synthase is an enzyme with systematic name (3S)-2,3-epoxy-2,3-dihydrosqualene mutase (cyclizing, beta-seco-amyrin-forming). This enzyme catalyses the following chemical reaction

 (3S)-2,3-epoxy-2,3-dihydrosqualene  beta-seco-amyrin

The enzyme from Arabidopsis thaliana is multifunctional.

References

External links 
 

EC 5.4.99